Gontard is a French surname created from the Germanic given name Gunthard. Notable people with the surname include:

Carl von Gontard (1731–1791), German architect
Guillaume Gontard (born 1971), French politician
Susette Gontard (1769–1802), German writer

French-language surnames